Bojan Zdelar (born 11 April 2000) is a Serbian sprint canoeist.

His most recent victory is the men's K-1 500 meters kayak single in the Canoe Sprint World U23 Championships in 2021.

At the 2020 Summer Olympics, he competed in the men's K-1 1000 metres and 200 metres.

He finished 4th in the K-1 500 metres event at the 2021 Canoe Sprint World Championships.

References

2000 births
Living people
Sportspeople from Sremska Mitrovica
Serbian male canoeists
Olympic canoeists of Serbia
Canoeists at the 2020 Summer Olympics